Eusebia del Rosario Ortiz Yeladaqui is a Mexican politician from Quintana Roo, affiliated with the Institutional Revolutionary Party (PRI), who served in the cabinet of Governor Félix González Canto.

Political career
Ortiz Yeladaqui is a PRI member from Quintana Roo who has occupied different positions both inside her party and in the Quintana Roo public service. From 1990 to 1993 she served as municipal president of Othón P. Blanco, succeeding her brother. She has also served as local deputy in the Congress of Quintana Roo and as president of the PRI in her home state.

In 2006 Governor Félix González Canto designated her as the head of the Quintana Roo Secretariat of Government (Spanish: Secretaría de Gobierno).

References

Living people
Politicians from Quintana Roo
Municipal presidents in Quintana Roo
Women mayors of places in Mexico
Members of the Congress of Quintana Roo
Institutional Revolutionary Party politicians
20th-century Mexican politicians
20th-century Mexican women politicians
21st-century Mexican politicians
21st-century Mexican women politicians
Year of birth missing (living people)